Robert Flores (born July 7, 1970) is a sports journalist, who works for MLB Network and NHL Network as a studio host for each. He fills in for Hot Stove on MLB Network. Flores formerly worked at ESPN. Joining the network in 2005, Flores was an anchor for ESPNEWS and for ESPN's SportsCenter (2007–2016).  Flores provided studio updates during each game of ABC College Football, and Saturday Night Football.  He also served as a substitute studio host for ESPN2's Friday Night Fights. Flores hosted the live afternoon edition of SportsCenter from noon - 3 p.m. with Chris McKendry until early September 2009, when he was replaced with John Buccigross. He was also a substitute host for Baseball Tonight. Flores announced on February 4, 2016 that he would be leaving ESPN after ten years.

Flores is a native of Houston, Texas.  He attended J. Frank Dobie High School in Houston and is in the JFD Hall of Fame. He graduated from the University of Houston with a B.A. in Radio/Television in 1992.

A noted fan of professional wrestling, Flores is also the proud owner of a prized Louisville Slugger Ric Flair model bat, autographed by Flair himself.

Notable incidents
In 2006, Flores was co-anchoring ESPNEWS with Danyelle Sargent when she made her now infamous statement "What the fuck was that," due to technical difficulties. Flores was once fired for muttering the same curse word on-air in 2004 when he worked for KEYE in Austin, Texas on a taped segment that was not intended for air.

In March 2015 he made a comment on SportsCenter that Iggy Azalea is "killing hip-hop" leading to numerous verbal jabs between him and Azalea's then boyfriend NBA shooting guard Nick Young.

References

External links
MLB Network Bio
Robert Flores ESPN Bio

1970 births
Living people
University of Houston alumni
Boxing commentators
Major League Baseball broadcasters
MLB Network personalities
College football announcers
American television sports anchors